A diatreme, sometimes known as a maar-diatreme volcano, is a volcanic pipe associated with a gaseous explosion. When magma rises up through a crack in Earth's crust and makes contact with a shallow body of groundwater, rapid expansion of heated water vapor and volcanic gases can cause a series of explosions. A relatively shallow crater (known as a maar) is left, and a rock-filled fracture (the actual diatreme) in the crust.  Where diatremes breach the surface they produce a steep, inverted cone shape.

Etymology and Geology

The word comes . The term diatreme has been applied more generally to any concave body of broken rock formed by explosive or hydrostatic forces, whether or not it is related to volcanism. Even within volcanology the term has been used more generally by some than others and continues to be in kimberlite terminology contentious.
A current geological understanding is that diatreme describes the overall structure cut into the substrate (some have used the term “pipe” for this hence common term volcanic pipe). In a simple diatreme, the structure narrows fairly regularly with depth, and eventually terminates in the dike (dyke), or part of a dike, that fed the eruption. The transition from diatreme to dike takes place in a “root zone” that is the lowest part of the diatreme structure, immediately above the dike itself, which comprises coherent igneous rock.  Maar-diatreme volcanoes are volcanoes produced by explosive eruptions that cut deeply into the country rock with the maar being "the crater cut into the ground and surrounded by an ejecta ring".

Global distribution 
Maar-diatreme volcanoes are not uncommon, reported as the second most common type of volcano on continents and islands.

Igneous extrusions cause the formation of a diatreme only in the specific setting where groundwater exists; thus most igneous intrusions do not produce diatremes as they do not reach the surface so as to become extrusions, and further do not also intercept significant amount of groundwater when they become extrusions. 

Examples of diatremes include the Blackfoot diatreme and Cross diatreme in British Columbia, Canada.

Economic importance 
Diatremes are sometimes associated with deposition of economically significant mineral deposits such as kimberlite magma, which originates in the upper mantle. When a diatreme is formed due to a kimberlite intrusion, there is a possibility that diamonds may be brought up, as diamonds are formed in the upper mantle at depths of 150-200 kilometers. Kimberlite magmas can sometimes include chunks of diamond as xenoliths, making them economically significant.

References

Kimberlite Emplacement Models 
Gannon, Megan, Maar-Diatreme Volcano Research May Help Geologists Predict Eruptions, Find Diamonds, Huffington Post, Posted: 10/07/2012
Kimberlite Diatremes, Colorado Geological Survey, 10-17-2012
Lorenz, Volker, Maar-Diatreme Volcanoes, their Formation, and their Setting in Hard-rock or Soft-rock Environments, Geolines, v. 15, 2003, pp. 72-83

External links

Volcanism